The 5th Vietnam Film Festival was held from May 12 to May 19, 1980 in Hanoi, Vietnam, with the slogan: "For the Socialist Fatherland and the people's happiness. For the development of the national cinema" (Vietnamese:  "Vì Tổ quốc xã hội chủ nghĩa và hạnh phúc của nhân dân. Vì sự phát triển của nền điện ảnh dân tộc").

Event 
The 5th Vietnam Film Festival was held on the occasion of the 90th birthday of President Hồ Chí Minh. This can be considered a successful film festival from the perspective of award-winning films, with the Golden Lotus feature films being "Cánh đồng hoang", "Mẹ vắng nhà", "Những người đã gặp" - the pinnacle of Vietnamese cinema after the war.

In particular, "Cánh đồng hoang", an excellent film, is still the Vietnamese film that won the highest award at an A-class international film festival, the Moscow International Film Festival.

There were 129 films in attendance at the Film Festival. Besides feature films, there are 3 Golden Lotus for documentary films and 2 Golden Lotus for Animated films.

The Festival went deeper into professional activities and paid attention to the quality of works when organizing a seminar "Striving to improve film quality" with the participation of a large number of film critics, filmmakers, writers, etc.

Audiences in Hanoi stayed up all night to gather at the August Cinema theater to ask for an increase in showings. In particular, two proms at Lenin Park attracted tens of thousands of people to respond and meet film artists.

Awards

Feature film

Documentary/Science film

Animated film

References 

Vietnam Film Festival
Vietnam Film Festival
1980 in Vietnam